Roberto Taylor (born 28 August 1949) is a retired Guatemalan soccer midfielder who played one season in the American Soccer League and one in the North American Soccer League.

Club career
Taylor grew up in Guatemala where he played for Tipografía Nacional and Cementos Novella.

United States
In 1971, he entered South Central Community College, but did not play soccer there.  In 1973, he transferred to the University of New Haven where he played for Joe Machnik. He played 26 games for New Haven, scoring 25 goals and adding 8 assists.  In 1976, he signed with the Connecticut Yankees of the American Soccer League.  He finished the season with fourteen goals, putting him fourth in the league in scoring.  He also garnered a Rookie of the Year recognition.  In 1977, he moved to the Hartford Bicentennials of the first division North American Soccer League. His career was cut short after a 1977 automobile accident left him unable to play.

He was inducted into the New Haven Hall of Fame in 1984 and the Connecticut Soccer Hall of Fame in 2008.

Retirement
He owns the Roberto Taylor Insurance Agency in New Haven. He coached high school soccer at Mark T. Sheehan High School.

External links
 NASL Statistics

References

1949 births
Living people
Guatemalan footballers
Connecticut Wildcats soccer players
Connecticut Bicentennials players
American Soccer League (1933–1983) players
North American Soccer League (1968–1984) players
Expatriate soccer players in the United States
New Haven Chargers men's soccer players
Association football midfielders
Guatemalan expatriate footballers
Guatemalan expatriate sportspeople in the United States